Lib Mandi Metropolitano Airport  is an airport serving the coastal town of San Bartolo, in the metropolitan area of Lima. It is located inside the Lima Region of Peru. It is a base of a school of pilots (Master of the Sky). Although the airport had previous service, there are currently no regularly scheduled flights.

See also
Transport in Peru
List of airports in Peru

References

External links
OpenStreetMap - Lib Mandy
SkyVector - Lib Mandy
Contract Pilot - Photos
Master of the Sky - Photos
aerolink

Airports in Peru
Buildings and structures in Amazonas Region